Thiago Eduardo do Amaral (born 25 January 1992), commonly known as Thiago Amaral, is a Brazilian professional footballer who plays as an attacking midfielder.

Club career

Youth career
Born and raised in São Bento do Sul, Brazil, Thiago began his footballing career in 2006 with the U-15 team of Brazilian top side, Grêmio Foot-Ball Porto Alegrense, commonly known as Grêmio. In 2007, he moved to Florianópolis where he signed a long-term contract with Figueirense FC and played there until in 2012 when he moved to Florianópolis's Avaí FC.

Brazil
Thiago began his professional footballing career in 2012 with Coritiba-based, Corinthians Alagoano club, J. Malucelli Futebol.

In January 2013, he moved to Brasília, the capital of Brazil where he signed a short-term contract with Legião FC club. He made 4 appearances in the 2013 Campeonato Brasiliense. He then moved to Jaraguá do Sul where he signed a short-term contract with Grêmio Esportivo Juventus club. He scored 2 goals in 6 appearances in the 2013 Copa Santa Catarina.

In 2014, he moved to São Paulo where he signed a short-term contract with VOCEM club. He scored 4 goals in 12 appearances in the 2014 Campeonato Paulista Segunda Divisão. Later in the same year, he moved to Várzea Grande, Mato Grosso where he trained with the first team of Operário Futebol Clube.

Bosnia and Herzegovina
He first moved out of Brazil in 2015 to Europe and more accurately to Bosnia and Herzegovina where he signed a one-year contract with NK Sloga Ljubuški club. He scored 9 goals in 15 appearances in the 2015 Druga Druga Liga

Oman
On 17 January 2016, he signed a one-year contract with Oman Professional League side, Salalah SC on a six-month contract. He made his Oman Professional League debut on 22 January 2016 in a 1-1 draw against 2014–15 Sultan Qaboos Cup runners-up, Sur SC.

Indonesia

In September 2016, he left for Indonesia and signed a one-year contract for Indonesia Soccer Championship A side, PS Barito Putera.

Lebanon
He moved to Lebanon in September 2017 where on 7 September he signed a one-year contract with Lebanese Premier League side Tripoli SC. He made his Lebanese Premier League debut and scored his first goal in the competition on 17 September 2017 in a 5-1 loss against Al-Ansar SC.

Iraq

In January 2018, he received a good proposal to play in the Kurdistan Premier League representing Zeravani SC. He made an impact, helping the team raise the champion's cup and being the league's top scorer, scoring 10 goals in 10 official games.

Soon after finishing the league season, he joined Erbil SC and made history, raising the team to the elite of Iraqi football, also winning the golden ball of the Kurdistan Premier League.

Return to Lebanon
Amaral returned to Lebanon in 2019, signing for newly promoted side Bourj FC.

Return to Indonesia
Since the last time in Indonesia in 2016, Amaral returned to Indonesia in 2020, On January 21, he signed a year contract with Indonesian Liga 1 side Persipura Jayapura.

References

External links

 
 
 
 Thiago Amaral at playmakerstats.com (English version of ogol.com.br and ceroacero.es)
 Thiago Amaral at calcio-talenti.it

1992 births
Living people
Brazilian footballers
Brazilian expatriate footballers
Association football midfielders
J. Malucelli Futebol players
Grêmio Esportivo Juventus players
Salalah SC players
PS Barito Putera players
Lebanese Premier League players
AC Tripoli players
Bourj FC players
Sheikh Russel KC players
Expatriate footballers in Bosnia and Herzegovina
Brazilian expatriate sportspeople in Bosnia and Herzegovina
Expatriate footballers in Oman
Brazilian expatriate sportspeople in Oman
Expatriate footballers in Indonesia
Brazilian expatriate sportspeople in Indonesia
Expatriate footballers in Lebanon
Brazilian expatriate sportspeople in Lebanon
Expatriate footballers in Iraq
Brazilian expatriate sportspeople in Iraq
Brazilian expatriate sportspeople in Bangladesh